"Fly Away With Me" is a song recorded by American singer-songwriter Sy Smith. It was written by Sy Smith and Kay of the Foundation, and produced by Ty Macklin for Smith's third studio album, Conflict.

Overview

Following the less successful chart performances of buzz single "Reach Down In Your Soul", the record was released as the album's first official single during the first quarter of 2008 (see 2008 in music) in North America. "Fly Away With Me" is a slow-tempo composition featuring R&B production and soul elements. While most of the tracks featured on Conflict are mid-tempo, "Fly Away With Me" was well received by critics for its beat-driven melody. The song peaked into the Top 40 Hot Adult R&B Singles Airplay Chart at #38. Fly Away With Me is Smith's first song to chart on the Hot Adult R&B Singles Airplay Chart and her second song to chart on any Billboard chart ("Gladly" is the first).

Music video

The video was shot on March 13, 2008 with Shawn Carter Peterson as the director. The song aired Centric's Soul Sessions and VH1 Soul.

The video features Smith singing in her house while writing the lyrics to her song. Her husband (Shawn Carter Peterson) then comes in and brings her fruit that he feeds to her. She then sings her lyrics to him while being held in his arms. They are later seen walking down a path as Peterson tells her to cover her eyes as he runs away (playing hide-and-seek). She later finds him and they are seen at the end of the video watching the sunset. Other scenes include Smith singing in a meadow and in a tree.

Formats and track listings
CD single
Album Version
Remix (featuring Kay of the Production)

Credits and personnel
 Vocals: Sy Smith
 Writers: Sy Smith and Kay of the Foundation
 Producers: Ty Macklin

References

2008 singles
Sy Smith songs
2008 songs